Seeyathamangai Ayavandeeswarar Temple
( ) is a Hindu temple located at Seeyathamangai in Nagapattinam district, Tamil Nadu, India. Seeyathamangai is also written as Siyathamangai and Tiruchaathamangai. The temple is dedicated to Shiva, as the moolavar presiding deity, in his manifestation as Ayavantheeswarar. His consort, Parvati, is known as Malarkkannammai.

Significance 
It is one of the shrines of the 275 Paadal Petra Sthalams - Shiva Sthalams glorified in the early medieval Tevaram poems by Tamil Saivite Nayanar Tirugnanasambandar. It is one of the shrines of the Vaippu Sthalams sung by Tamil Saivite Nayanar Appar.

Literary mention 
Tirugnanasambandar describes the feature of the deity as:

References

External links

Gallery

Shiva temples in Nagapattinam district
Hindu temples in Nagapattinam district
Padal Petra Stalam